Příkazy (1939–1945 Pschikas) is a municipality and village in Olomouc District in the Olomouc Region of the Czech Republic. It has about 1,300 inhabitants. Old part of the village is well preserved and is protected by law as a village monument reservation.

Administrative parts

The village of Hynkov is an administrative part of Příkazy.

Geography
It is located in the Upper Morava Valley. The northernmost part of the municipality lies in the Litovelské Pomoraví Protected Landscape Area and the Morava River flows through it.

History
The first written mention of Příkazy is from 1250 and of Hynkov is from 1437.

Transport
Příkazy lies on the local railway line Olomouc–Drahanovice. The D35 motorway goes through the municipality.

Sights
The Chapel of Saints Cyril and Methodius was built in 1924–1926 and is an example of modern sacral architecture. The interior was painted by Jano Köhler.

Příkazy is known for the Hanakian Open Air Museum. It is a unique example of clay folk architecture of the Haná region. The complex consists of three barns from the first half of the 19th century and one barn from 1987, followed by a garden with fruit trees and a complete Hanakian farm with a residential and farming part from 1875.

References

External links

Villages in Olomouc District